Aureoboletus betula is a species of mushroom producing fungus in the family Boletaceae. It is commonly known as the Shaggy Stalked Bolete.

Taxonomy 
It was first described in 1822 by the German-American mycologist Lewis David de Schweinitz and classified as Boletus betula. It has been reclassified many times over the years and is still sometimes referred to by the 2004 classification Heimioporus betula as given to it by the Austrian mycologist Egon Horak.

In 2020 it was reclassified as Aureoboletus betula by the mycologists Michael Kuo and Beatriz Ortiz-Santana.

Description 
Aureoboletus betula features finely pitted spores. It is found under oaks, or in mixed woods of pine and oak, primarily in the southern Appalachians.

This bolete has a stem that is deeply, coarsely reticulate and, when the mushroom is in the "button" stage, often as wide as, or even wider than, the cap. With development the stem stretches out dramatically, becoming notably long. The sticky cap is reddish to yellow or orange, and the non-bruising pore surface is yellow, becoming slightly greenish with age. Under the microscope, Aureoboletus betula features finely pitted spores.

Cap: 2–5 cm. Convex and broadening with age. Starts golden yellow discolouring to brownish yellow or reddish orange. Texture is sticky and flesh is yellow. Pores: 1-2 pores every millimeter with tubes that are 1.5 cm deep. Bright yellow turning greenish yellow with age. Stem: 10–15 cm tall with a thickness of  1–2 cm. Distinctly textured with deep ridges with a slightly swollen and rooting base. Stem flesh is white with pink staining when exposed to air. Spore print: Olive. Spores: Ellipsoid. 16-24 x 7-12 µm. Taste: Indistinct. Smell: Indistinct.

Edibility 
This species is edible.

Etymology 
The specific epithet 'betula', meaning birch is not in reference to any specific habitat characteristics like growing under birch trees but rather a reference to the shaggy bark of birch trees which the stipe of this species is reminiscent of.

References

betula
Fungi of North America